The 2015 Leicester City Council election took place on 7 May 2015 to elect members of Leicester City Council in England. This was on the same day as other local elections, the 2015 general election and the election for the directly elected Mayor of Leicester.

Election result
The 54 councillors are elected from 27 wards, each electing either 2 or 3 councillors. The results of the election were that 52 Labour councillors were elected, with 1 Conservative and 1 Liberal Democrat. This is unchanged from the 2011 local election.

Ward Results

Abbey (3)

Aylestone (2)

Beaumont Leys (3)

Belgrave (3)

Braunstone Park and Rowley Fields (3)

Castle (3)

Evington (3)

Eyres Monsell (2)

Fosse (2)

Humberstone and Hamilton (3)

Knighton (3)

North Evington (3)

Rushey Mead (3)

Saffron (2)

Spinney Hills (2)

Stoneygate (3)

Thurncourt (2)

Troon (2)

Westcotes (2)

Western (3)

Wycliffe (2)

References

2015 English local elections
May 2015 events in the United Kingdom
2015
2010s in Leicester